The Kazakhstan national under-16 basketball team is a national basketball team of Kazakhstan, administered by the Kazakhstan Basketball Federation.
It represents the country in international under-16 (under age 16) basketball competitions.

See also
Kazakhstan men's national basketball team
Kazakhstan men's national under-19 basketball team
Kazakhstan women's national under-16 basketball team

References

External links
 Archived records of Kazakhstan team participations

under
Men's national under-16 basketball teams